Jos Schummer (11 December 1930 – 17 July 1980) was a Luxembourgian wrestler. He competed in the men's Greco-Roman light heavyweight at the 1952 Summer Olympics.

References

1930 births
1980 deaths
Luxembourgian male sport wrestlers
Olympic wrestlers of Luxembourg
Wrestlers at the 1952 Summer Olympics
Sportspeople from Luxembourg City